Calybites phasianipennella is a moth of the family Gracillariidae. It is known from all of Europe and most of Asia.

The wingspan is 10–11 mm. The forewings are dark fuscous; three costal spots at 1/3, and 3/4 before apex, and two dorsal spots at 1/4 and 1/2 ochreous-whitish, more or less dark-margined, often very indistinct. Hindwings rather dark grey. The larva is greenish -grey; dorsal line darker; head yellowish, black-spotted; segment 2 with yellowish plate and four black spots.

Adults are on wing in September and overwinters as an adult, after which it can be found to April or May.

The larvae feed on Chenopodium hybridum, Fallopia aubertii, Fallopia convolvulus, Lysimachia vulgaris, Lythrum salicaria, Oxyria digyna, Persicaria amphibia, Persicaria hydropiper, Persicaria lapathifolia, Persicaria maculosa, common sorrel (Rumex acetosa), sheep's sorrel (Rumex acetosella), Rumex aquaticus, Rumex hydrolapathum and Rumex obtusifolius. They mine the leaves of their host plant. The mine starts as an epidermal corridor, later it becomes a pale and later brown, usually lower-surface blotch that may obliterate the initial corridor. The silk at the inside of the mine causes it to buckle and fold. The frass is deposited in a corner of the mine. Older larvae leave the mine and continue feeding inside a cone, made by cutting off a strip of leaf tissue and binding it with silk.

References

External links
Lepiforum.de

Gracillariinae
Moths described in 1813
Moths of Asia
Moths of Europe
Taxa named by Jacob Hübner